The Battle of Coilsfield was a semi-legendary clash in Ayrshire, Scotland, between an allied force of Picts and Scots under Fergus I and an army of Britons led by Coilus, the Coel Hen of the Welsh genealogies. The Britons had invaded Ayrshire in response to an uprising and established a substantial camp on or near the banks of the River Doon, south of the town of Ayr.  Place-names such as "Cynning Park", "North Park", "Gear Holm", "Wrights Field", "Slap-house" Burn, and most telling, "Cambusdoon", provide clues to the extent of the encampment and the numbers of men involved.  Fergus allowed the Britons to languish in their camp well into winter, so as to exhaust their supplies and whittle down their numbers through disease and desertion.  Taking advantage of a drunken Yule-tide revelry in the camp, the Picts and Scots attacked at night during the first watch.  The camp, which according to Vegetius had no ramparts or palisade, was successfully overrun.  The army of Coilus fled the Doon-side camp in complete panic.  After a circuitous retreat south around the "Craigs of Kyle", over the flooded "Water of Coyle" at a place remembered as "the King's Steps" and back again northward, Fergus cornered the remnants west of the hamlet of Failford, and slaughtered Coilus and his men at the place now called Coilsfield.  The few survivors rallied around the remnants of the baggage train, and after a brief truce the following day, Fergus wisely allowed them to depart.  Place-names in this area include "Dead-mens Holm", "The Bloody Burn", "Fergus-lea", "Cairn-gillan Hill", "Shackle Hill", and "King Coil's Grave", a Bronze-age burial mound.

A poem written by Ayr schoolmaster, John Bonar around 1631, records important details of this event as found only in local memory:

While scholars since the nineteenth century have dismissed the battle as fantasy, some researchers have found that accounts of the event may have been recorded in contemporary and subsequent literature. The Late Roman writer Vegetius in book III for instance writes: "An army too numerous is subject to many dangers and inconveniences. Its bulk makes it slow and unwieldy in its motions; and as it is obliged to march in columns of great length, it is exposed to the risk of being continually harassed and insulted by inconsiderable parties of the enemy. The incumbrance of the baggage is often an occasion of its being surprised in its passage through difficult places or over rivers. The difficulty of providing forage for such numbers of horses and other beasts of burden is very great. Besides, scarcity of provisions, which is to be carefully guarded against in all expeditions, soon ruins such large armies where the consumption is so prodigious, that notwithstanding the greatest care in filling the magazines they must begin to fail in a short time. And sometimes they unavoidably will be distressed for want of water. But, if unfortunately this immense army should be defeated, the numbers lost must necessarily be very great, and the remainder, who save themselves by flight, too much dispirited to be brought again to action." Vegetius warns, as if in response to a court of inquiry: "It may be said that our troops for many years past have not even fortified their permanent camps with ditches, ramparts or palisades. The answer is plain. If those precautions had been taken, our armies would never have suffered by surprises of the enemy both by day and night."

The British writer Gildas offers a passage in his de Excidio that has similarities to the Coilsfield disaster: "To oppose their attacks, there was stationed on the height of the stronghold, an army, slow to fight, unwieldy for flight, incompetent by reason of its cowardice of heart, which languished day and night in its foolish watch. In the meantime the barbed weapons of the naked enemies are not idle."

References

Boece, "Historia Gentis Scotorum" Book I. 27-9

External links
Video footage of the King's Steps

Coilsfield
Coilsfield